Dan Dodd (born February 15, 1978) is a former Democratic member of the Ohio House of Representatives who represented the 91st District from 2007 to 2010. A lawyer by trade, Dodd practiced with Robert J. Dodd, Jr. Co. LPA in New Lexington, Ohio. While elected to office in 2006 and reelected in 2008, Dodd lost a third term in 2010.

He has since become the executive director of the Ohio Association of Independent Schools.

References

External links
Ohio Association of Independent Schools: Director Dan Dodd

Living people
Members of the Ohio House of Representatives
1978 births
People from New Lexington, Ohio
21st-century American politicians
People from Licking County, Ohio